Sunitha Varma Alluri is an Indian actress who works in the South Indian film industries. She has been appearing in feature films in Telugu, Malayalam and Tamil films along with a few Kannada languages for over a decade, since her debut in Neevente Nuventa (2001).

Biography
She is a non-practising Hindu.

Career
In 2001, she made her film debut through the Telugu film Neevente Nuventa and went on to act in a few more Telugu movies. She made her debut in Tamil cinema 2005 Oru Murai Sollividu under the stagen name Janapriya, which went unnoticed. She again reverted to her original name and acted in further Tamil films including the crime thriller 6'2 opposite Sathyaraj, and the experimental film Iruvar Mattum which features only two characters.

She changed her name to Radha Varma and made her Malayalam film debut by starring with Dileep in the successful 2008 comedy film Crazy Gopalan.

Filmography

References

External links 

 

Actresses from Visakhapatnam
Actresses in Telugu cinema
Indian film actresses
Living people
Actresses in Tamil cinema
Actresses in Malayalam cinema
21st-century Indian actresses
Telugu actresses
Actresses in Kannada cinema
1980 births
20th-century Indian actresses
Female models from Andhra Pradesh